Connecticut's 81st House of Representatives district elects one member of the Connecticut House of Representatives. It encompasses parts of Southington and has been represented by Republican John Fusco since 2017.

Recent elections

2022

2020

2018

2016

2014

2012

References

81